Fiszewo  is a village in the administrative district of Gmina Gronowo Elbląskie, within Elbląg County, Warmian-Masurian Voivodeship, in northern Poland.

The village has a population of 270.

It was the site of a massacre of Polish insurgents of the November Uprising committed by the Prussians on 27 January 1832. Prussian troops opened fire on the Polish insurgents, killing eight and wounding twelve, another four of whom eventually died of wounds. There is a monument to the victims of the massacre in Fiszewo, and an annual rally is held to commemorate them.

Transport
The National road 22 bypasses Fiszewo in the west.

References

Fiszewo
Massacres of Poles